Aleksei Dmitriyevich Kashtanov (born 13 March 1996) is a Russian football player. He plays for FC Ural Yekaterinburg.

Club career
He made his debut in the Russian Professional Football League for FC Kaluga on 20 July 2015 in a game against FC Arsenal-2 Tula.

He made his debut in the Russian Premier League for FC Ural Yekaterinburg on 16 July 2022 in a game against PFC CSKA Moscow. On 30 December 2022, Kashtanov moved to Ural on a permanent basis after playing on loan.

Career statistics

References

External links
 
 Profile by Russian Football National League 2
 

1996 births
People from Dyatkovsky District
Sportspeople from Bryansk Oblast
Living people
Russian footballers
Association football forwards
FC Volga Ulyanovsk players
FC Ural Yekaterinburg players
Russian Second League players
Russian Premier League players